Being Globally Responsible Conference (BGRC) is an annual, 2-day corporate social responsibility (CSR) event held in May at China Europe International Business School (CEIBS) in Shanghai, China. Activities during the event include keynote speeches, discussion panel, and workshops surrounding a designated theme. It was initiated by a CEIBS MBA student Sam Lee back in 2006. Currently, it is the earliest and largest MBA student organized international CSR conference in Asia-Pacific and a flagship event of CEIBS MBA.

Past Conferences

Evolution of BGRC
Since its incubation, BGRC has expanded throughout the years:
1st BGRC (2006)- 3 days conference held in June.  All 300 participants reached ‘Shanghai Consensus 2006’, agreeing to terms such as not working for companies that are irresponsible in an environmental or social context.
2nd BGRC (2007)- 3 days conference held in May.  Participants included 150 MBA students from over 20 business schools in Asia-Pacific area and over 50 business professional and NGO representatives.
3rd BGRC (2008)- 3 day conference held in June.  For the first time, there were students from international schools.  Attendees included MBA students from 22 domestic and 17 international schools.
4th BGRC (2009)- 2 day conference held in June. BGRC Invited 46 local and global top business schools to participate.  For the first time, it had an exclusive Live Broadcasting media web page reporting the event (by Tencent). There were also added activities such as a student essay competition and interactive gaming.
5th BGRC (2010)- 2 day conference held in May.  At this event, Green Campus, a committee geared towards turning CEIBS into an exemplary institution in sustainable and environmental issues, was introduced.  Activities also included photographic exhibitions and environment promotion movie shows.

Past Themes
2007- Responsible Leaders, Building a Sustainable Future
2008- New horizon, better world, highlighted topics included environmental protection, poverty reduction and social entrepreneurship
2009- Make a Difference, encapsulated the message of how to empower the individual to take measures that are implementable and quantifiable in the area of sustainability
2010- Better City, Better Life, focused on social value of sustainable development.  This was tied to 2010 Shanghai EXPO

External links 
 (Archived)
Related news on BGRC

Corporate social responsibility
Social ethics
Annual events in China